German rapper Bonez MC has released three studio albums and five collaborative albums. He was awarded for sales of 6.6 million units in Austria, Germany and Switzerland.

Albums

Studio albums

Collaborative albums

EPs

Mixtapes
 2008: Mehr geht nicht

Singles

Other charted songs

Featured in 

Other charting songs as featured in

References

Discographies of German artists
Hip hop discographies